Raisin Charter Township is a charter township of Lenawee County in the U.S. state of Michigan.  The population was 7,559 at the 2010 census.

Communities
East Raisin was an area in the eastern part of the township.  Euro-American settlement in this area began in 1816 and a community developed.

Geography

Demographics
At the 2000 census, there were 6,507 people, 2,265 households and 1,845 families residing in the township. The racial makeup of the township was 96.00% White, 0.54% African American, 0.43% Native American, 0.49% Asian, 1.54% from other races, and 1.00% from two or more races. Hispanic or Latino of any race were 4.81% of the population.

There were 2,265 households, of which 40.1% had children under the age of 18 living with them, 71.5% were married couples living together, 7.1% had a female householder with no husband present, and 18.5% were non-families. 15.1% of all households were made up of individuals, and 5.4% had someone living alone who was 65 years of age or older. The average household size was 2.85 and the average family size was 3.17.

28.7% of the population were under the age of 18, 6.8% from 18 to 24, 29.5% from 25 to 44, 26.4% from 45 to 64, and 8.5% who were 65 years of age or older. The median age was 36 years. For every 100 females, there were 97.4 males. For every 100 females age 18 and over, there were 98.6 males.

The median household income was $57,088 and the median family income was $59,977. Males had a median income of $44,973 vand females $25,614. The per capita income was $21,703. About 1.9% of families and 2.9% of the population were below the poverty line, including 1.2% of those under age 18 and 7.1% of those age 65 or over.

References

Sources

External links
Raisin Charter Township official website
Lenawee County government site
Complete text of History of Lenawee County published in 1909 by the Western Historical Society

Townships in Lenawee County, Michigan
Charter townships in Michigan
1826 establishments in Michigan Territory
Populated places established in 1826